Nikolay Todorov (born 26 September 1964, in Balchik) is a retired Bulgarian professional football midfielder and currently manager.

Todorov played for several clubs in Europe and the Bulgaria national football team.

Todorov's son, also named Nikolay, is currently a striker for Dunfermline Athletic in the Scottish League one.

Career
Todorov started his career in Dobrudzha Dobrich. He played for the most of his career in Levski Sofia where he made a name for himself, when he scored the second and winning goal for Levski vs. Scottish giants Rangers FC in a 1993–94 UEFA Champions League clash, when Levski eliminated the Scottish champions. He also played in CSKA Sofia, Lokomotiv Sofia, Montpellier HSC, SM Caen, Anorthosis Famagusta FC and Septemvri Sofia. He played one season in the Turkish Super Lig with Sarıyer G.K. His nickname the Kaiser comes from the Dutch striker Piet Keizer.

He played twelve games for the Bulgarian national football team and scored 3 goals. A true leader with a powerful shot.

After his retiring from a playing career, he coached Levski's youth team and in September 2012 he was appointed manager of PFC Minyor Pernik. He took over as head coach of Botev Vratsa in December 2015, a position he held until early May 2016.

On 14 December 2017, Todorov returned at the helm of Minyor Pernik.

International goals
Scores and results list Bulgaria's goal tally first.

Awards
Bulgarian champion with Levski: 1985, 1994, 1995
Bulgarian cup winner with Levski: 1994

References

External links

1964 births
Living people
Bulgarian footballers
Bulgaria international footballers
First Professional Football League (Bulgaria) players
Ligue 1 players
Süper Lig players
Cypriot First Division players
PFC Dobrudzha Dobrich players
PFC CSKA Sofia players
PFC Levski Sofia players
FC Lokomotiv 1929 Sofia players
Montpellier HSC players
AS Cannes players
Anorthosis Famagusta F.C. players
Sarıyer S.K. footballers
Bulgarian expatriate footballers
Expatriate footballers in France
Expatriate footballers in Turkey
Expatriate footballers in Cyprus
Bulgarian football managers
People from Balchik
Association football midfielders